The  is one of the expressways of Japan from Kitakyūshū (and the bridge to Honshū) to east of Kagoshima linking with the Kyushu Expressway. It runs north to south, through the prefectures of Fukuoka, Oita, Miyazaki and the Kagoshima prefectures. The freeway runs entirely on the island of Kyūshū. The total length is 500 km.

Overview
The first section of the expressway was opened to traffic in 1999. As of March 2009 the expressway incomplete in many areas. The next section is scheduled to open in 2010 (Soo Yagorō Interchange to Sueyoshi Takarabe Interchange). After this, Most of the incomplete areas will be built according to the New Direct Control System, whereby the burden for construction costs will be shared by the national and local governments and no tolls will be collected. Currently the section between Saiki Interchange and Nobeoka Minami Interchange, and Kanoya Kushira Junction and Sueyoshi Takarabe Interchange operates according to this principle.

The expressway is 4 lanes from Kitakyushu Junction to Kanda Kitakyushu-kūkō Interchange and Hiji Junction to Ōita Miyagawachi Interchange, and 2 lanes for all remaining sections.

The route parallels the Nippō Main Line of Kyushu Railway Company and National Route 10 for much of its length.

History 
 December 15, 1994, a section from Hiji Junction to Hayami Interchange was opened to traffic.
 November 27, 1999, a section from Oita Mera to Oita Miyagawachi Interchanges was opened to traffic.
 March 4, 2000, a section from Kokubu to Hayato Higashi Interchange was opened to traffic with another freeway.
 March 25, 2000, a section from Miyazaki Nishi Interchange to Kiyotake Junction was opened to traffic.
 March 31, 2001, a section from Saito to Miyazaki Nishi Interchange was opened to traffic.
 April 18, 2001, the Oita Nogyo Bunka Koen Interchange was opened.
 December 19, 2001, the Kajiki Junction was opened to traffic with another freeway.
 December 27, 2001, a section from Oita Miyagawachi to Tsukumi Interchanges was opened to traffic.
 March 2, 2002, a section from Sueyoshi Takarabe to Kokubu Interchanges was opened to traffic.
 March 30, 2002, the Hiji Junction was opened to traffic with another freeway.
 February 26, 2006, a section from Kitakyushu Junction to Kanda Kitakyushu Airport Interchange was opened to traffic.
 June 28, 2008, a section from Tsukumi to Saiki Interchange was opened to traffic.
 March 14, 2010, a section from Soo Yagoro to Sueyoshi Takarabe Interchange was opened to traffic. 
 July 17, 2010, a section from Takanabe to Saito Interchange was opened to traffic. 
 December 14, 2010, a section from Kadogawa to Hyuga Interchange was opened to traffic with another freeway.
 December 15, 2012, a section from Sumie to Kitagawa Interchange was opened to traffic.
 December 22, 2012, a section from Tsuno to Takanabe Interchange was opened to traffic.
 February 16, 2013, a section from Kamae to Kitaura Interchange was opened to traffic.
 March 23, 2013, a section from Kiyotake Junction to Kiyotake Minami Interchange was opened to traffic.
 March 8, 2014, a section from Kitaura to Sumie Interchange was opened to traffic.
 March 16, 2014, a section from Hyuga to Tsuno Interchange was opened to traffic.
 March 23, 2014, a section from Kanda Kitakyushu Airport to Yukuhashi Interchange was opened to traffic.
 December 13, 2014, a section from Yukuhashi to Miyako Toyotsu Interchange was opened to traffic with another freeway.
 December 13, 2014, the Shiida Minami Interchange was opened.
 December 21, 2014, a section from Kanoya Kushira Junction to Soo Yagoro Interchange was opened to traffic.
 December 21, 2014, the Kanoya Kushira Junction was opened to traffic with another freeway.
 March 1, 2015, a section from Buzen to Usa Interchanges was opened to traffic with another freeway.
 March 21, 2015, a section from Saiki to Kamae Interchanges was opened to traffic.
 April 28, 2015, the Imagawa Parking Area and the Yukuhashi Imagawa Bus Stop was opened.
 April 24, 2016, a section from Shiida Minami to Buzen Interchange was opened to traffic which made the Higashikyushu Expressway from Kitakyushu to Miyazaki fully accessible with no gaps.
 March 25, 2017, the Kadogawa Minami Smart Interchange was opened.
 March 11, 2018, a section from Nishinan Kitago to Nichinan Togo Interchanges was opened to traffic.
 August 5, 2018, a section from Hiji Junction to Oita Mera Interchange is incorporated as part of the Higashikyushu Expressway.
 August 5, 2018, the Beppuwan Smart Interchange was fully accessible.
 October 6, 2019, the Kunitomi Smart Interchange was opened.

Interchanges 

 IC - interchange, SIC - smart interchange, JCT - junction, SA - service area, PA - parking area, BS - bus stop, TN - tunnel, BR - bridge, TB - toll gate
 Bus stops labeled "○" are currently in use; those marked "◆" are closed.

Between Kitakyushu Junction and Aburatsu Interchange

Between Aburatsu and Natsui Interchanges

Between Shibushi Interchange and Kajiki Junction

Expressways in Japan
Kyushu region